Man Meets Dog is a zoological book for the general audience, written by the Austrian scientist Konrad Lorenz in 1949. The first English-language edition appeared in 1954.

The original German title is So kam der Mensch auf den Hund, which could be literally translated as "How man ended up with dog". The German title is also a play on the phrase "Auf den Hund kommen", which is a common idiom in German-speaking countries and probably comes from the old days when farmers with economic problems had to sell their livestock animals and ended up with only the dog.

Contents
The opening chapter "How it may have started" deals with theories concerning the question where and when man first domesticated the predecessor of the modern dog. The book has a lot of interesting anecdotes of the author's experiences with dogs, these stories are often illustrated with simple drawings. Lorenz usually owned several dogs and many other animals and lived with them in his house near Vienna. There are also many insights into the behavior of cats and birds, though the focus is on the behavior of dogs.

References

1949 non-fiction books
Zoology books
Works by Konrad Lorenz